Abdul Rahman Mokhtar (22 March 1958 – 26 June 2013) was a Malaysian politician. He was Terengganu State Representative for Kuala Besut.

Death
Mokhtar died of lung cancer on 26 June 2013 at the age of 55.

References

1958 births
2013 deaths
People from Terengganu
United Malays National Organisation politicians
Malaysian Muslims
Malaysian people of Malay descent
Members of the Terengganu State Legislative Assembly